Don't Look Back is a 2009 French thriller film directed by Marina de Van and starring Sophie Marceau and Monica Bellucci. Written by Jacques Akchoti and Marina de Van, the film is about a wife and mother of two children who suddenly notices changes to the way the family home is arranged and feels that her body is transforming without anyone around her noticing it. While others believe her perceptions are due to fatigue and stress, she is sure that something more profound is happening, and her search to understand these mysterious perceptions prompts her to track down a woman in Italy who holds the key to the mystery.

Plot
Jeanne, a married woman with two young children, starts to notice small changes taking place in the arrangement of objects in her family's home—furniture, pictures, rooms—as well as in her physical appearance. She seems to be the only one noticing these changes, but still she is absolutely certain that her perceptions are a result of something personal, as everyone else seems to think. Feeling increasingly out of sorts, ever more distant, and even psychologically cut off from her husband and children, who are baffled by her behavior, Jeanne goes to her mother in the hope that she, at least, will provide for her some clarification or otherwise soothing solution.

At her mother's home, Jeanne comes across a photograph of what she believes, or has been led to believe, is herself as a young girl, her mother, and another woman. What she sees in that photograph moves her to travel to Italy in order to track down the woman in the photograph. In Italy, Jeanne finds the woman, and in a way, discovers herself as well. She begins to solve the mystery behind her changes, and comes to learn the truth about herself.

Cast

Filming locations
 Lecce, Apulia, Italy 
 Luxembourg 
 Paris, France

Release
Don't Look Back was screened out of competition at the 2009 Cannes Film Festival.

References

External links
 
 
 Don't Look Back at uniFrance

2009 films
2000s French-language films
2009 horror films
2000s horror thriller films
Films directed by Marina de Van
French horror thriller films
Luxembourgian horror thriller films
Films about shapeshifting
New French Extremity films
2000s French films